"The London" is a song by American rapper Young Thug featuring fellow American rappers J. Cole and Travis Scott, released through Atlantic Records and 300 Entertainment as the lead single and closing track from the former's debut studio album So Much Fun on May 23, 2019. Written alongside Babyface and producer T-Minus, it was nominated for Best Rap/Sung Performance at the 62nd Grammy Awards.

Background
The song is named after The London, a luxury hotel in West Hollywood, California.

Composition
"The London" is in the key of E Minor at 98 BPM.

Critical reception
Writing for Rolling Stone, Charles Holmes said that J. Cole "steals the show" and "sounds at home" on the track, and "outraps" Young Thug.

Promotion
The collaboration was previously advertised on flyers at the Rolling Loud Festival in Miami on May 11, 2019, which said a "summer anthem" was coming from the three rappers.

Music video
The music video for the song was released on August 1, 2019, on Young Thug's official YouTube channel.

Personnel
Credits adapted from Geoff Ogunlesi's Instagram and Tidal.

 Young Thug – vocals, songwriting
 J. Cole – vocals, songwriting
 Travis Scott – vocals, songwriting
 T-Minus – production, songwriting
 Gosha Usov – recording
 Juro "Mez" Davis – mixing
 Alex Tumay – mixing
 Jimmy Cash – additional mixing
 Joe LaPorta – mastering
 Shaan Singh – engineering

Charts

Weekly charts

Year-end charts

Certifications

Release history

References

2019 songs
2019 singles
Young Thug songs
J. Cole songs
Travis Scott songs
300 Entertainment singles
Atlantic Records singles
Songs written by T-Minus (record producer)
Songs written by Young Thug
Songs written by J. Cole
Songs written by Travis Scott
Song recordings produced by T-Minus (record producer)
Songs written by Babyface (musician)